Potato Corner is a global Philippine food franchise known for its flavored French fries. Potato Corner's first stall opened up in SM Megamall in October 1992 in the Philippines under Cinco Corporation. As of 2022, Potato Corner is present in 17 countries globally which include the Philippines, Indonesia, United States, Panama, Australia, Thailand, Hong Kong, Cambodia, Singapore, Vietnam, Malaysia, Kuwait, Myanmar, Saudi Arabia, Canada, the United Kingdom and New Zealand.

International expansion 

Potato Corner was founded by Jose Magsaysay Jr., Ricky Montelibano, Danny Bermejo and George Wieneke in 1992. Montelibano is Magsaysay's brother-in-law and was the first to introduce flavored popcorn to the Philippines. Although he had been working for a local Wendy's for nine years, Magsaysay needed to support his family and came up with the idea of flavored fries, based on Montelibano's business. They had to borrow money to raise the starting financial capital of ₱150,000 (US$6,000). Magsaysay left his management job at Wendy's and the first Potato Corner, a cart in Mandaluyong, opened in October 1992. Within thirty days, all of them were able to pay back their loans.

After their initial success, they began to consider expanding through franchises. Magsaysay knew only the basics of franchising from his job at Wendy's and at the time it was a novel idea in the Philippines. As such, their first franchisee agreements were largely informal and their first franchisee signed a document they copied from online. The group raised funds for their expansion and quickly became large in the local market.

In 2006, Potato Corner opened its first international store in Indonesia. This was followed by Potato Corner's first entry in the United States in February 2010 and first store in the United States in 2012. In April 2017, Potato Corner opened its first Hong Kong franchise in Tsim Sha Tsui. As of 2022, Potato Corner is available in the Philippines, Indonesia, United States, Panama, Australia, Thailand, Hong Kong, Cambodia, Singapore, Vietnam, Kuwait, Malaysia, Canada, Myanmar, Kingdom of Saudi Arabia, The United Kingdom and New Zealand. In late 2022, the franchise expanded to the United Kingdom opening the first outlet in London. The franchise also expanded to New Zealand opening its first outlet in Auckland.

Awards and recognition 
Potato Corner garnered a number of accolades through the years. Potato Corner bagged the Best Franchisee of the Year for three consecutive years from PFA and DTI. Awarded by the same organizations, Potato Corner also received the Franchisee Excellence Hall of Fame Award in 2003 and the Global Filipino Franchise Award in 2017.

Marketing and advertising

Mascot 
Potato Corner's official mascot, Spudster, was introduced by the brand in 2009, and can be seen in all of its stores and buckets. Spudster received a Master License for Los Angeles County in 2009.

References

External links 

 Official website

1992 establishments in the Philippines
French fries
Food and drink companies of the Philippines